Presley Branch is a stream in northern Fulton County, Arkansas and southeastern Howell County, Missouri.

The stream flows south roughly parallel to Missouri Route PP then crosses under Missouri Route 142 and enters Arkansas where it turns southwest and enters Myatt Creek about one-half mile south of the border.

Presley Branch has the name of Pinkney Presley, a pioneer citizen.

See also
List of rivers of Arkansas
List of rivers of Missouri

References

Rivers of Fulton County, Arkansas
Rivers of Howell County, Missouri
Rivers of Arkansas
Rivers of Missouri